Enebeli Elebuwa  (1946–2012) was a Nigerian actor.

Early life
Elebuwa was born in the northern part of Delta State. He is an Ukwuani by origin from Isumpe quarters of Utagba-Uno in Ndokwa-West Local Government Area of Delta State.

Death
Elebuwa suffered a major stroke and was flown overseas for medical treatment. He died aged 66 in a hospital in India on 5 December 2012 and was laid to rest at Vaults & Gardens, Ajah, Lagos, formerly Victoria Court Cemetery.

Filmography
Royal War
Bent Arrows
Against my Blood
A Prize to Pay
City of Kings
Last Dance

References

External links

2012 deaths
1947 births
Nigerian male film actors
Male actors from Delta State
20th-century Nigerian male actors
Burials at Victoria Court Cemetery
Nigerian male television actors